Perth Assembly was a controversial book published by the Pilgrims in Leiden in 1619 the year before they departed in the Mayflower for Massachusetts; the book was smuggled into Scotland in wine vats. King James I was offended by the book which was critical of the Five Articles of Perth which had been ratified by the General Assembly in Perth in 1618 and forced the episcopacy form of church governance on Scotland. The printer was Johannes Sol ("Soule") and the primary publishers were Thomas Brewer and William Brewster who went into hiding in 1619 before surreptitiously departing for Plymouth to escape threat of arrest.  Other Pilgrims, such as George Soule (presumably the brother of the printer Johannes Sol), were also believed to have been involved in the printing of the book, and the controversy caused them to flee on the Mayflower and disguise their origins. Johannes Sol's apprentice, Edward Raban, fled to Scotland in 1620  with Sol's pregnant widow after his death in a printing ink accident.

References

External links
Full copy of the Perth Assembly online

1619 books
17th-century Christian texts
Puritanism in England
English emigration
English colonization of the Americas
History of the Church of England
17th century in the Dutch Republic
Calvinism in the Dutch Republic
British expatriates in the Dutch Republic
Plymouth Colony
New England Puritanism